Waco was a Japanese toy manufacturer.  It was known for manufacturing the handheld game Electro Tic-Tac-Toe.   Released in 1972, the game is commonly cited as the first commercially available handheld electronic game.

 However some sources do not consider the Electro Tic-Tac-Toe to be the first handheld electronic game.

The game was designed for two players.

See also
 History of computer and video games
 First video game
 Handheld game console
 Tic-tac-toe

References

Defunct toy manufacturers